United Nations General Assembly Resolution 62/167, titled "Situation of Human Rights in the Democratic People's Republic of Korea", is a resolution of the United Nations General Assembly about the situation in North Korea, which was adopted on December 18, 2007 at the 62nd session of the General Assembly. In the resolution, the United Nations General Assembly expresses serious concern at the persistence of the systematic, widespread and grave violations of human rights in North Korea, urging the Government of North Korea to respect fully all human rights and fundamental freedoms.

Voting

Controversy in South Korea 
Former Foreign Minister Song Min-soon, in his memoir, has claimed that Seoul abstained from the vote on the UN resolution about North Korea's human rights situation after hearing Pyongyang's opinion. His disclosure of the inappropriate communication provoked a huge controversy in South Korean politics.

See also
Human rights in North Korea
Human experimentation in North Korea
Human trafficking in North Korea

References

United Nations General Assembly resolutions
2007 in the United Nations
December 2007 events
Foreign relations of North Korea
North Korea and the United Nations
Human rights in North Korea